Samuel Napier (28 July 1883–unknown) was an Irish footballer who played in the Football League for Bolton Wanderers and Glossop.

References

1883 births
Irish association footballers (before 1923)
Association football forwards
English Football League players
Glentoran F.C. players
Bolton Wanderers F.C. players
Glossop North End A.F.C. players
Linfield F.C. players
Association footballers from Belfast
Year of death missing